Climate change in Puerto Rico encompasses the effects of climate change, attributed to man-made increases in atmospheric carbon dioxide, in the U.S. territory of Puerto Rico.

The United States Environmental Protection Agency reports: "Puerto Rico's climate is changing. The Commonwealth has warmed by more than one degree (F) since the mid 20th century, and the surrounding waters have warmed by nearly two degrees since 1901. The sea is rising about an inch every 15 years, and heavy rainstorms are becoming more severe. In the coming decades, rising temperatures are likely to increase storm damages, significantly harm coral reefs, and increase the frequency of unpleasantly hot days". A 2019 report stated that Puerto Rico "is affected by climate change more than anywhere else in the world".

Rising seas and retreating shores

"Sea level has risen by about four inches relative to Puerto Rico’s shoreline since 1960. As the oceans and atmosphere continue to warm, sea level around Puerto Rico is likely to rise one to three feet in the next century. Rising sea level submerges marshes, mangroves, and dry land; erodes beaches; and exacerbates coastal flooding".

Storms, homes, and infrastructure

"Tropical storms and hurricanes have become more intense during the past 20 years. Although warming oceans provide these storms with more potential energy, scientists are not sure whether the recent intensification reflects a long-term trend. Nevertheless, hurricane wind speeds and rainfall rates are likely to increase as the climate continues to warm".

"Cities, roads, and ports in Puerto Rico are vulnerable to the impacts of both winds and water during storms. Greater wind speeds and the resulting damages can make insurance for wind damage more expensive or difficult to obtain. Coastal homes and infrastructure are likely to flood more often as sea level rises because storm surges will become higher as well. As a result, rising sea level is likely to increase flood insurance premiums for people living along the coast. The changing climate is also likely to increase inland flooding. Since 1958, rainfall during heavy storms has increased by 33 percent in Puerto Rico, and the trend toward increasingly heavy rainstorms is likely to continue. More intense rainstorms can increase flooding as inland rivers overtop their banks more frequently, and more water accumulates in low-lying areas that drain slowly".

Water resources

"Although heavy rainstorms may become more common, total rainfall is likely to decrease in the Caribbean region, especially during spring and summer. Warmer temperatures also reduce the amount of water available because they increase the rate at which water evaporates (or transpires) into the air from soils, plants, and surface waters. With less rain and drier soils, Puerto Rico may face an increased risk of drought, which in turn can affect public water supplies, agriculture, and the economy. For example, during the 2015 drought—one of the worst in Puerto Rico's history—hundreds of thousands of people faced water restrictions, and some people’s water was turned off for one or two days at a time".

Coral reefs and ocean acidification

"In the next several decades, warming waters are likely to harm most coral reefs, and widespread loss of coral is likely due to warming and increasing acidity of coastal waters. Rising water temperatures can harm the algae that live inside corals and provide food for them. This loss of algae weakens corals and can eventually kill them. This process is commonly known as "coral bleaching" because the loss of algae also causes corals to turn white".

"Increasing acidity can also damage corals. Ocean acidity has increased by about 25 percent in the past three centuries, and it is likely to increase another 40 to 50 percent by 2100. As the ocean becomes more acidic, corals are less able to remove minerals from the water to build their skeletons. Shellfish and other organisms also depend on these minerals, and acidity interferes with their ability to build protective skeletons and shells".

"Warming and acidification could harm Puerto Rico’s marine ecosystems and economic activities that depend on them. Coral reefs provide critical habitat for a diverse range of species, while shellfish and small shellproducing plankton are an important source of food for larger animals. Healthy reefs and fish populations support fisheries and tourism".

Ecosystems

"Warmer temperatures and changes in rainfall could expand, shrink, or shift the ranges of various plants and animals in Puerto Rico’s forests, depending on the conditions that each species requires. For example, as summer rainfall decreases, tree species that prefer drier conditions could move into areas once dominated by wet forest species. Other species might shift to higher altitudes. Many tropical plants and animals live in places where the temperature range is fairly steady year-round, so they cannot necessarily tolerate significant changes in temperature. Coqui frogs, bromeliads, mosses, and lichens are potentially vulnerable. Freshwater ecosystems also face risks due to climate change. Rivers, streams, and lakes hold less dissolved oxygen as they get warmer, which can make conditions less hospitable for fish and other animals".

Agriculture

"Higher temperatures are likely to interfere with agricultural productivity in Puerto Rico. Hot temperatures threaten cows’ health and cause them to eat less, grow more slowly, and produce less milk. Reduced water availability during the dry season could stress crops, while warmer temperatures could also reduce yields of certain crops. Studies in other tropical countries indicate that climate change may reduce plantain, banana, and coffee yields".

Human health

"Hot days can be unhealthy—even dangerous. Certain people are especially vulnerable, including children, the elderly, the sick, and the poor. Rising temperatures will increase the frequency of hot days and warm nights. High air temperatures can cause heat stroke and dehydration and affect people’s cardiovascular and nervous systems. Warm nights are especially dangerous because they prevent the human body from cooling off after a hot day. Since 1950, the frequency of warm nights in Puerto Rico has increased by about 50 percent. Currently in San Juan, the overnight low is above 77 degrees about 10 percent of the time. Puerto Rico’s climate is suitable for mosquito species that carry diseases such as malaria, yellow fever, and dengue fever. While the transmission of disease depends on a variety of conditions, higher air temperatures will likely accelerate the mosquito life cycle and the rate at which viruses replicate in mosquitoes".

"Certain types of water-related illnesses already occur in Puerto Rico, supported by its warm marine environment. These include vibriosis, a bacterial infection that can come from direct contact with water or eating infected shellfish, and ciguatera poisoning, which comes from eating fish that contain a toxic substance produced by a type of algae. Higher ocean temperatures can increase the growth of these bacteria and algae, which may increase the risk of these associated illnesses.

References

+Puerto Rico
Environment of Puerto Rico